Chlornaltrexamine is an irreversible mixed agonist–antagonist for μ-opioid receptors, which forms a covalent bond to the active site. It is 22 times more potent than morphine. Its alkylating group is a bis(chloroalkyl)amino-residue similar to that of the nitrogen mustards.

See also
 Chloroxymorphamine, an irreversible full agonist
 Naloxazone, an irreversible μ-opioid antagonist
 Oxymorphazone, an irreversible full agonist

References

Alkylating agents
Organochlorides
Semisynthetic opioids
Phenols
4,5-Epoxymorphinans
Irreversible agonists
Nitrogen mustards
Chloroethyl compounds
Cyclopropyl compounds